Thomas Schuster (14 February 1937 – 5 January 1990) was a Fijian boxer. He competed in the men's light welterweight event at the 1956 Summer Olympics.

References

1937 births
1990 deaths
Light-welterweight boxers
Fijian male boxers
Olympic boxers of Fiji
Boxers at the 1956 Summer Olympics
People from Ba Province